Smell Like a Man, Man is a television advertising campaign in the United States created by ad agency Wieden+Kennedy for the Old Spice brand of male grooming products, owned by Procter & Gamble. The campaign is also commonly referred to as The Man Your Man Could Smell Like, being the title of the campaign's initial 30-second commercial. The campaign was initially launched to market Old Spice's Red Zone After Hours Body Wash, but has subsequently been expanded to include other products following the success of the initial advertisements. The campaign targets female viewers, despite the product's target market being male, as the company determined that women frequently make purchasing decisions in respect of hygiene products even for male household members.

The campaign centers on the eponymous "Man Your Man Could Smell Like", played by actor Isaiah Mustafa (Old Spice refers to him as "Old Spice Man") addressing the viewer in confident, rapid-fire monologues which promote the benefit of using Old Spice products. While reciting the monologues, Mustafa progresses through various activities, locations, costumes, and extraordinary situations, all in one uninterrupted take while maintaining constant eye-contact with the camera in a nonchalant demeanor. The advertisements typically feature a surprise ending.

Background
As of the early 2000s, Old Spice held position as the leader in the U.S. market for men's deodorant and body wash, with a market share of twenty percent. However, the brand was regarded as deeply unfashionable and largely coasting on an aging reputation. Procter & Gamble had sold off several of its other older brands such as Noxzema skin cream, Sure deodorant and Comet cleanser in order to focus on products with potential for faster growth, and Old Spice was on the shortlist for a similar sale if it could not demonstrate further growth.

In 2006, Wieden+Kennedy replaced Saatchi & Saatchi as the advertising agency for the brand. Advertising spending for the account was minimal in the years running up to the handover, with campaigns aimed at holding on to the brand's primary demographic of men over thirty years old. Procter & Gamble completed its acquisition of the Gillette brand of razors and personal care products at around the same time, and sought to pivot to market both brands to younger consumers. 

The Man Your Man Could Smell Like represented a swing towards humour and lighthearted advertising aimed at a younger demographic. Old Spice took on several celebrity spokespeople popular with younger consumers, such as the actors Neil Patrick Harris and Will Ferrell, and the rap artist LL Cool J.

Commercials

Initial commercials
The campaign was launched with two commercials: the primary 30-second spot, and a shorter 15-second companion piece, both written by Craig Allen and Eric Kallman of Wieden+Kennedy. The spots promote Old Spice's Red Zone After Hours Body Wash.

The original ad, entitled "The Man Your Man Could Smell Like", was directed by Tom Kuntz, and features Mustafa reciting a monologue about how "anything is possible" if a man uses Old Spice. In a single uncut shot, Mustafa transitions from a bathroom to a sailboat to riding a horse on the beach, all without pausing his monologue or breaking eye contact with the camera for more than a moment. The punchline of the commercial is Mustafa's non sequitur final statement: "I'm on a horse", delivered as the camera zooms out to reveal to the viewer that Mustafa is now sitting atop a horse.

Allen and Kallman confirmed that the commercial was filmed in a single uninterrupted take  requiring three days of shooting and numerous attempts to achieve a successful take. Minimal computer-generated imagery (CGI) was used, consisting of overlaying a separately shot artificial hand during the segment where diamonds flow from Mustafa's palm and the body wash rises through the pile of diamonds with a separately filmed shot of the hand. The remaining effects were practical and achieved on-set, including a crane lifting the bathroom set from above, a crew member dropping a pre-formed shirt over Mustafa's head from above, and a cart that carried Mustafa from the boat set onto the back of a horse.

The ad was first broadcast online on 4 February 2010. It debuted on U.S. television four days later during the commercial breaks for new episodes of American Idol and Lost and coverage of the 2010 Winter Olympics. This delay was timed to take advantage of the predicted increase interest in advertising for the days following Super Bowl XLIV. Its release was widely commented on in the American media, with features appearing in publications such as the Los Angeles Times and the New York Daily News, and Mustafa was invited to appear on several television talk shows, including The Oprah Winfrey Show. The Man Your Man Could Smell Like was a popular, critical, and financial success. By the end of June 2010, it had been viewed online over 11,000,000 times, and had received a number of honours from the advertising and television industries, including the Grand Prix at the Cannes Lions International Advertising Festival, the most prestigious award ceremony of the marketing community. At one point in mid-July 2010, videos from the series accounted for eight of the top eleven most-popular videos on YouTube.

Filmed at the same time as the main commercial was a 15-second "sting" entitled "Did You Know", in which the camera zooms out of Mustafa to reveal that he is riding a horse backwards.

"Questions" and "Boat"
In June 2010, a third commercial entitled "Questions" began to air on television. The new commercial followed a similar single-shot format to the original ad, and again promoted Old Spice Red Zone After Hours Body Wash.

The ad expanded upon the first commercial, which featured two changes of location, and only one on camera (the bathroom "set" lifting away). In "Questions", there were more frequent changes of location with more extravagant transitions. Mustafa begins at a shower station on the beach. The scenery splits in half (as do false legs and a towel) and pulls away to reveal Mustafa log rolling before he walks across the surface of a lake (catching a falling cake mid-stride) into a kitchen (power-sawing a countertop mid-stride) to the top of a waterfall, which he "swan dives" off into a hot tub, which then collapses to reveal that Mustafa is sitting on a motorcycle, his shorts having been replaced by jeans. He performs the entire commercial without breaking eye contact with the camera, while addressing female viewers and asking rhetorical questions on what they like, implying that if their man used Old Spice, then he could bring them these things.

The ad was again shot primarily in one take,  involving an automatically rolling log, an under-water platform, and a set consisting of the kitchen, waterfall and hot tub containing water and a motorcycle. The walls of the hot tub were rigged to mechanically rise and lower.  Support wires were used to control Mustafa's dive from the waterfall.  Footage of rehearsals of the ad begin with the log-rolling, suggesting that the opening beach segment may include separately shot or computer-generated elements. The background also appears to be enhanced.

Another 15-second ad entitled "Boat" was produced as a secondary spot. It features Mustafa in a rowboat pulling off a "fake" mustache, and then "pulling off" the newly revealed skin to reveal another moustache.

"Scent Vacation"
A third series of commercials debuted in early 2011, this time promoting Old Spice Fresh Collection Antiperspirant and Deodorant. The branding of the product line revolves around different world locations. In keeping with that theme, the 30-second commercial is entitled "Scent Vacation", and continues to maintain and expand upon the style of the previous ads. In the ad, Mustafa notes that "when your man smells like Old Spice, you can go anywhere."

In "Scent Vacation", Mustafa begins on a beach in a grass skirt. The beach drops away and the skirt flies off to reveal Mustafa in mountaineering pants atop a mountain peak. He dives from the mountain, into water, appearing to swim through it, only for it to be revealed as a fishtank, which passes as the camera rotates to reveal Mustafa lying on his side in white slacks on top of a piano in a lavish living room.

Responding to interest in the creation of the previous spots, an official behind-the-scenes video was released for "Scent Vacation". It reveals that much of the ad is again produced practically, with some camera tricks. For his dive from the mountaintop, Mustafa was raised on wires as the camera spun to simulate Mustafa's movement. Ultimately, the living room in which Mustafa is shown was built against a vertical wall, and the camera was rotated 90 degrees to make the room appear normally oriented.

Unlike the previous commercials, which were shot outdoors, "Scent Vacation" was shot on a soundstage. More computer-generated imagery was used in this commercial than in the prior ads. The sand and sky of the initial beach scene and the entire mountain backdrop were added in post-production; wires were painted out, as were seams where two scenery pieces came together; fish were added to the aquarium; chocolate was added to a fondue fountain in the living room, and a stick of fondue foods was added to Mustafa's hand.

Two 15-second spots were produced, entitled "Fiji" and "Komodo" after two of the scents in the product line. In "Fiji", a beach scene is shown as Mustafa's voice is heard. Mustafa rises from beneath the sand with an acoustic guitar, which he opens to reveal that it contains puppies.

In "Komodo", Mustafa appears to stand at the base of a hill atop which sits an ancient palace. The palace is revealed to be a miniature, as Mustafa opens the front wall to reveal the product. He then walks over to a Komodo dragon and pulls open its back to reveal a cooler containing ice cream.

The three spots share a common thread of misleading items containing other items. Aside from the guitar, the palace and the Komodo dragon, in "Scent Vacation" Mustafa also picks up a mountain goat, which he spins around to reveal a harp.

Additional materials
Mustafa gained significant popularity and notoriety from the initial ads, and he and Old Spice capitalized by producing a plethora of online videos featuring Mustafa in-character. In a series of videos, Mustafa responded by video to numerous Twitter posts directed to Old Spice's Twitter account, including several videos directed towards celebrities. Other longer videos were created as well.

In 2011, it was announced that Fabio would become the Old Spice spokesman, leading to criticism from fans of Mustafa. This led to a poll as to which spokesman viewers preferred. A "Mano a Mano" video was produced featuring a confrontation between the two.

In 2015, Mustafa was pitted against Terry Crews, who stars in another ad campaign for Old Spice, as dueling spokesmen for Old Spice's "Timber" and "Bear Glove" scents. In the "Make a Smellmitment" crossover campaign, Mustafa advertises Timber (in some advertisements, Mustafa instead pitches another scent, "Swagger") in his usual deadpan, while Crews touts the virtues of Bear Glove in the high-energy, absurdist style common to what is seen in Crews's ad campaign.

In 2018, Mustafa appeared in one of Tide's Super Bowl LII commercials. The ad was one of several crossovers in which other commercials (including other Procter & Gamble brands' advertising campaigns for Old Spice and Mr. Clean) segued into Tide ads because all of the clothes in them were fresh and clean, including Mustafa's white pants. In 2019, Mustafa appeared in an ad for Hulu that parodied these commercials.

Reception
The New York Daily News gave the initial ad a favorable mention, citing Mustafa's "wildly smug, cool-cat smooth dude persona", which "helped make the cologne commercial pop". People magazine's Blane Bachelor called Mustafa's monologue "sharply scripted" and his character "smug, and over the top". The commercial was a hit on video-sharing websites, such as YouTube, where it had already received over 60 million views by February 22, 2022. In June 2010 the ad won the Grand Prix for film at the Cannes Lions International Advertising Festival, and in July 2010 it won a Primetime Emmy Award for Outstanding Commercial.

The created feeling of connection between the Old Spice Man and the audience, which is also known as a parasocial relationship, formed an important part of the success of the campaign. Overall this combined with the original ad series to become one of the "most popular viral campaigns in recent history".

In popular culture
The spot has been parodied on Sesame Street, where the monster Grover takes Mustafa's role to illustrate the word 'on'. However, his narrations do not go as smoothly: the dropped shirt fails to fall around his neck; the clam containing the tickets bites his nose, forcing him to fling it away; and despite claiming he is on a horse at the end, he is actually on a cow.

It was also parodied on iCarly, on the episode "iOMG".

There was also a parody released in 2011, close to the release of the film Puss in Boots, and in 2019, featuring Mustafa, to advertise Hulu.

It was parodied by How It Should Have Ended for an episode on It Chapter Two, in which the character Mike (who is played by Mustafa in the film) puts his own spin on the commercial's lines.

In 2018, Tide released a series of Super Bowl advertisements. One commercial featured Mustafa performing part of "The Man Your Man Could Smell Like".

See also 

 Make a Smellmitment

References

External links

2010 in American television
2010 works
American television commercials
American advertising slogans
Internet memes introduced in 2010
Procter & Gamble
Super Bowl commercials
Wieden+Kennedy
Winners of the Cannes Lions International Advertising Festival Film Grand Prix
2010 neologisms
2010s television commercials